"Only Human" is a 1996 song by British singer Dina Carroll. It was released as the third single from her second album by the same name (1996), and peaked at number 33 in both Scotland and the UK.

Critical reception
A reviewer from Music Week rated the song three out of five, writing, "Much more simplistic orchestrally and vocally than her last hit Escaping, this ballad has that Christmassey sound which should propel it into the Top 10."

Track listing

Charts

References

 

Dina Carroll songs
1996 singles
1996 songs
Pop ballads
1990s ballads
Mercury Records singles
First Avenue Records singles